This is a list of notable ayurveda colleges in India.

Assam
Government Ayurvedic College, Guwahati

Haryana 
 Baba Mastnath University (BMU)

Kerala 
 Vaidyaratnam Ayurveda College, Thrissur

Meghalaya
North Eastern Institute of Ayurveda and Homeopathy

References

India
Ayurvedic